The 2016–17 CONCACAF Champions League knockout stage was played from February 21 to April 26, 2017. A total of eight teams competed in the knockout stage to decide the champions of the 2016–17 CONCACAF Champions League.

Qualified teams
The winners of each of the eight groups in the group stage advanced to the quarter-finals.

Seeding

The qualified teams were seeded 1–8 in the knockout stage according to their results in the group stage.

Format

In the knockout stage, the eight teams played a single-elimination tournament. Each tie was played on a home-and-away two-legged basis, with the higher-seeded team hosting the second leg. The away goals rule was used if the aggregate score was level after normal time of the second leg, but not after extra time, and so a tie was decided by penalty shoot-out if the aggregate score was level after extra time of the second leg (Regulations, II. D. Tie-Breaker Procedures).

Bracket
The bracket of the knockout stage was determined by the seeding as follows:

Quarter-finals
The first legs were played on February 21–23, and the second legs were played on February 28 – March 2, 2017.

|}

All times U.S. Eastern Standard Time (UTC−5)

Vancouver Whitecaps FC won 3–1 on aggregate.

FC Dallas won 5–2 on aggregate.

Pachuca won 4–0 on aggregate.

UANL won 4–1 on aggregate.

Semi-finals
The first legs were played on March 14−15, and the second legs were played on April 4−5, 2017.

|}

All times U.S. Eastern Daylight Time (UTC−4)

UANL won 4–1 on aggregate.

Pachuca won 4–3 on aggregate.

Final

The first leg was played on April 18, and the second leg was played on April 26, 2017.

|}

All times U.S. Eastern Daylight Time (UTC−4)

Pachuca won 2–1 on aggregate.

References

External links
CONCACAF Champions League , CONCACAF.com

3